Soft Lights, Sweet Music is the fourth album by the Detroit, Michigan-based R&B group Enchantment.

Track listing
"Settin' It Out" - 3:59 
"I'm Who You Found (Not Who You Lost)" - 4:13 
"I Believe in You" - 5:04 
"Moment of Weakness"  - 3:45 	
"I Can't Fake It" - 2:54 
"Soft Lights, Sweet Music" - 4:20
"Are You Ready for Love" - 4:07
"I Can't Be The One" - 3:07
"You and Me" - 5:03

Personnel
Emanuel Johnson, George Roundtree, Rudy Robinson, William Wooten, Eugene Butler  - Keyboards
Bruce Nazarian - Guitar
Jerry Jones - Drums
Greg Coles, Tommy DeLoch, Anthony Tony Willis, Jervonny Collier - Bass
Mike Lacopelli, Trenita Womack, Carl "Butch" Small - Percussion

Charts

Singles

References

External links
 Enchantment-Soft Lights, Sweet Music at Discogs

1980 albums
Enchantment (band) albums
RCA Records albums
Albums produced by Don Davis (record producer)